Abundo is a surname. Notable people with the surname include:

Alvin Abundo (born 1992), Filipino basketball player
Teresita Abundo (born 1949), Filipino educator and athlete

See also
 Abundio